A Mis Amigos is a 1959 studio album by Nat King Cole to the Latin market, arranged by Dave Cavanaugh and recorded in Rio de Janeiro, during his Brazilian tour,

This was Cole's second album of Spanish themed music (despite that it also features three songs in Portuguese, "Suas Mãos", "Caboclo Do Rio" and "Não Tenho Lágrimas"), following Cole Español (1958) and preceding More Cole Español (1962).

Reception

The AllMusic review by William Ruhlmann awarded the album three-and-a-half stars, and said that Cole "still didn't have much feeling for Spanish."

This album was a big hit in Brazil during the 60s where it became Cole's most recognized work.

Track listing
 "Ay, Cosita Linda" (Galan) – 2:16
 "Aquellos Ojos Verdes" (Menendez) – 2:13
 "Suas Mãos" (Maria, Pernambuco) – 2:21
 "Capullito De Aleli" (Hernandez) – 2:28
 "Caboclo Do Rio" (DeOliveira) – 1:54
 "Fantastico" (Keller, Sherman) – 1:55
 "Ninguém Me Ama" (Lobo, Maria) – 2:33
 "Yo Vendo Unos Ojos Negros" (Osvaldo Silva) – 2:22
 "Perfidia" (Alberto Domínguez) – 2:20
 "El Choclo" (Villoldo, Discépolo, Marambio Catán) – 2:13
 "Ansiedad" (Jose Enrique Sarabia) – 3:27
 "Não Tenho Lágrimas" (Bulhoes, DeOliveira) – 2:18

Personnel
Nat King Cole – vocals (2-4, 6, 9-12, lead on 1, 5, 7-8)
Sylvia Telles – additional lead vocals (5, 7)
Irakitan Trio  – background vocals (1, 5, 8)
Dave Cavanaugh – arranger, conductor
John Collins – guitar
Charles P. Harris  – bass played by
Lee Young – drums

References

Capitol Records albums
Spanish-language albums
Albums arranged by Dave Cavanaugh
Nat King Cole albums
1959 albums
Latin music albums by American artists